"The Audition" is the seventh episode of the second season of the American dark comedy crime television series Barry. It is the 15th overall episode of the series and was written by consulting producer Liz Sarnoff, and directed by series co-creator Alec Berg. It was first broadcast on HBO in the United States on May 12, 2019.

The series follows Barry Berkman, a hitman from Cleveland who travels to Los Angeles to kill someone but finds himself joining an acting class taught by Gene Cousineau, where he meets aspiring actress Sally Reed and begins to question his path in life as he deals with his criminal associates such as Monroe Fuches and NoHo Hank. In the episode, Sally passes a chance for a series after she views the content as "revenge porn" and gets jealous when Barry effortlessly gets an audition for a big role in a film. Meanwhile, Hank and the Chechens pay for their betrayal.

According to Nielsen Media Research, the episode was seen by an estimated 1.87 million household viewers and gained a 0.8 ratings share among adults aged 18–49. The episode received positive reviews from critics, with Sarah Goldberg's acting receiving particular praise. For her performance in the episode, Sarah Goldberg received an Outstanding Supporting Actress in a Comedy Series nomination at the 71st Primetime Emmy Awards.

Plot
Lindsay (Jessy Hodges) gets Sally (Sarah Goldberg) a meeting for a possible TV series role. She is offered the part of an empowering role in the series for a powerful producer, which delights her. In the waiting room, Barry (Bill Hader) is approached by one of Lindsay's associates, resulting in him getting an audition for a film directed by Jay Roach. Once he tells Sally, she gets upset by the idea that he easily got an audition.

Sally meets with the producer, Aaron Ryan (David Douglas), for the role. Her excitement diminishes once she finds that the TV series just features abused women killing their husbands, deeming it "revenge porn" and passes. Her agents get mad at her decision and she storms off, confused if she did the right thing. Barry approaches Gene (Henry Winkler) about his role, with Gene finding that he is actually the lead of the film. Gene then helps Barry to prepare for his audition, even expressing surprise that he managed to get the audition for a big role. While rehearsing their scene, Sally expresses her discomfort about revealing her true story and expressing her frustration with her journey, which seems to surprise Barry.

Hank (Anthony Carrigan) and the Chechens are taken away in a bus, per Cristobal's orders. After some traveling, the bus stops at a desert and Cristobal's men start pouring gasoline over the bus, with Hank and his men tied to their seats. As Hank starts apologizing for his actions, the Chechens free themselves and start a shootout with the Bolivians and Burmese. Hank is still tied in his seat just as the bus catches fire, losing consciousness. He suddenly wakes up outside the bus, the Chechens having saved him. After the Chechens execute the person who betrayed them, they abandon Hank for his actions, choosing to follow Mayrbek.

Lindsay offers Sally the opportunity to have the acting class perform their scenes on a large stage in order to get Sally's story out into the world, which she accepts. Before his audition, Barry is informed by Gene that he will not be able to play alongside him as he was told of a possible lead on Moss' murder and must return to the lake house for help. He then passes the phone to the "detective" in charge, Fuches (Stephen Root), shocking Barry. Barry tells him that he will return to his criminal life if he lets Gene live but Fuches hangs up. During his audition, a distracted Barry is unable to properly perform his scene. Barry then leaves, although Roach seems intrigued by his take on the character.

At the lake house, Gene mentions his relationship with Barry, noting how Barry felt he was "lost" until he guided him to acting. The comment clearly angers Fuches, who decides to lead him to Moss' car. He then takes Gene's phone to call the police. He reports Moss' body but also pretends to be Gene, claiming that he killed her before he plans to commit suicide. He then opens the trunk, revealing Moss' body and leaving Gene shaken. As Barry hurries through the woods to get in time to their location, Fuches aims his gun at Gene's head.

Production

Development
In April 2019, the episode's title was revealed as "The Audition" and it was announced that consulting producer Liz Sarnoff had written the episode while series co-creator Alec Berg had directed it. This was Sarnoff's second writing credit, and Berg's fourth directing credit.

Writing
Liz Sarnoff's initial draft of the script had very little involvement of Barry, who was described as "just kind of follows Sally around." Bill Hader and Alec Berg reviewed options, noting that Barry cut ties with important figures (Fuches and the Chechens) in the previous episode, so he would now be in a "good place". So they wrote the segment of Barry getting a role in a film but only because of his looks. Hader deemed the episode "the most sitcom-y episode we've ever done."

In the episode, Sarah Goldberg performs a three-minute monologue, filmed in a long take. The writers wanted a scene that could properly tell Sally's feelings to Barry and decided to make use of Goldberg's theater background to film the scene in a long take. Goldberg performed the monologue in four takes, all of which received applause from the crew. Goldberg viewed the scene as a "real gift" and was delighted to see that the scene was included in its entirety without any cuts in the final broadcast version.

Casting
Director Jay Roach and casting director Allison Jones make cameo appearances as themselves, in the scene where Barry attends an audition for a film. Roach was directing Bombshell around the time the episode was filming but was interested in appearing in the series, taking a day off to film his scene.

Reception

Viewers
The episode was watched by 1.87 million viewers, earning a 0.8 in the 18-49 rating demographics on the Nielson ratings scale. This means that 0.8 percent of all households with televisions watched the episode. This was a slight decrease from the previous episode, which was watched by 1.99 million viewers with a 0.8 in the 18-49 demographics.

Critical reviews
"The Audition" received positive reviews from critics. Vikram Murthi of The A.V. Club gave the episode a "B+" and wrote, "Barry has maintained a consistently dark tone this season, even at its funniest, so it's a nice bit of modulation to see it indulge in some relatively lighter fare. But from the moment when Gene calls Barry to inform him that private detective 'Kenneth Goulet' wants to take a look at the cabin, Sarnoff and director Alec Berg throw you right back into the series' deep end." 

Nick Harley of Den of Geek wrote, "'The Audition' is a packed episode, but as stated earlier, it's really a culmination of Sally's arc this season. She gets something of a happy ending when her agent reveals that she's dedicated to getting Sally meaningful work, which is probably more than most struggling actress get. Next week is the finale, and where we leave Barry, Gene, Hank, and Fuches seems to indicate that we may be losing one of our central characters. Unlike the show that directly proceeds this program, excited to see how the season ends."

Accolades
TVLine named Sarah Goldberg as an honorable mention as the "Performer of the Week" for the week of May 18, 2019, for her performance in the episode. The site wrote, "Barrys eternally aspiring actress Sally was under a lot of pressure this week, and Sarah Goldberg let it all come spilling out in a messy, frantic monologue that had us ready to cast her on the spot. Confessing her fears about her upcoming showcase and standing 'naked' on stage to tell her story and also her intense jealousy at Barry landing a dream audition while she toils in obscurity, Sally scarcely took a breath as she unpacked every bit of her emotional baggage. Her whole monologue might've actually been one long run-on sentence, now that we think about it — but Goldberg was both touchingly vulnerable and utterly hilarious through every rambling second of it."

Goldberg submitted the episode in consideration for her Outstanding Supporting Actress in a Comedy Series at the 71st Primetime Emmy Awards.

References

External links
 "The Audition" at HBO
 

Barry (TV series) episodes
2019 American television episodes